George Bankes (1788–1856) was the last of the Cursitor Barons of the Exchequer, the office being abolished by Conservative ministry of the Earl of Derby in 1852.  Without any legal experience at the bar, he was the last barrister to be appointed to the post considered to be a medieval anachronism.

Early life
Bankes was the third son of Henry Bankes, MP of Kingston Hall, Dorsetshire, who represented Corfe Castle for nearly fifty years, and of Frances, daughter of William Woodley, governor of the Leeward Islands. Bankes was a lineal descendant of Sir John Bankes, Chief Justice of the Common Pleas in the reign of Charles I. He was educated at Westminster School and Trinity Hall, Cambridge.

Career
Bankes studied law first at Lincoln's Inn, and afterward at the Inner Temple, and was called to the bar by the latter society in 1815. In the following year, he entered Parliament as his father's colleague for the family borough of Corfe Castle, which he represented in every succeeding Parliament until 1823. He was again returned for Corfe Castle in 1826, and sat until 1832, when the family borough was united with that of Wareham.

He does not appear to have achieved any remarkable professional success, but owing, presumably, to his family influence, he was appointed one of the bankruptcy commissioners in 1822, and Cursitor Baron in 1824. In 1829, under the Wellington administration, he became chief secretary of the Board of Control, and in the next year a Junior Lord of the Treasury, and one of the commissioners for the affairs of India.

Bankes was returned unopposed for Corfe Castle at the general election of 1826 and occupied the seat until 1832. In 1831, while returning to Purbeck in an open carriage from the declaration at the Dorset county election in the company of Lord Encombe, he was stoned at Wareham by a mob of a hundred men. Although there were no injuries, it was stated that Encombe might have died had not an umbrella deflected one of the stones from his head. At the general election in 1841 Bankes again entered Parliament, being returned by the county of Dorset, for which he continued to sit until his death. A Tory, he strenuously opposed Robert Peel's commercial reforms. During the short administration of the Earl of Derby in 1852, Bankes held the office of Judge Advocate General, and was sworn a Privy Councillor.

On the death of his elder brother, William John Bankes, in 1855, he succeeded to the family estate at Kingston Lacy, but died himself the following year at his residence in Old Palace Yard, Westminster. He left three sons and five daughters by his wife Georgina Charlotte, only child of Admiral Sir Charles Nugent, G.C.B. Kingston Lacy passed to his eldest son, Edmund George Bankes.

Writing
Bankes was the author of The Story of Corfe Castle and of many who have lived there, and of Brave Dame Mary, a work of fiction inspired by the life of Mary Bankes.

References

External links 
  (Corfe Castle)
  (Dorset)

1788 births
1856 deaths
People educated at Westminster School, London
Alumni of Trinity Hall, Cambridge
Members of the Inner Temple
People from Dorset
Conservative Party (UK) MPs for English constituencies
Tory MPs (pre-1834)
Members of the Privy Council of Great Britain
UK MPs 1818–1820
UK MPs 1820–1826
UK MPs 1826–1830
UK MPs 1830–1831
UK MPs 1831–1832
UK MPs 1841–1847
UK MPs 1847–1852
UK MPs 1852–1857
English barristers
Members of the Privy Council of the United Kingdom